Henry or Hendrick Hulsbergh or Hulsberg (died 1729) was a Dutch engraver of maps and architecture who worked in London from at least 1709 onwards.

Life
Born in Amsterdam, Hulsbergh was in London by 1709. He was mainly employed engraving large architectural compositions such as Colen Campbell's Vitruvius Britannicus, Kip's Britannia Illustrata,  and Christopher Wren's Designs for St. Paul's Cathedral. He also engraved portraits, including one of Georg Andreas Ruperti, pastor of the Dutch Church in London in 1709. Hulsberg was warden of the Lutheran Church in the Savoy Hospital, and was supported by the congregation and the brethren of a Dutch club during two years of continued illness and disability. He died in May 1729 of a paralytic fit, and was buried in the Savoy.

Locations
Bramham Park

Engravings

References

External links
Hulsbergh at the National Portrait Gallery - 6 portraits engraved by Hulsbergh

Year of birth unknown
1729 deaths
Dutch engravers
Dutch expatriates in England
Artists from Amsterdam